Wang Zhixiang; 1858–1930) was a politician of the Republic of China. He was born in Beijing during the Qing dynasty. He was the 9th Republican mayor of his hometown.

References

Bibliography
 
 

1858 births
1930 deaths
Republic of China mayors of Beiping
Qing dynasty people
People from Tongzhou